The Kojarena Sandstone is a Middle Jurassic geologic formation from Australia. It consists of red-brown, medium- to coarse-grained ferruginous sandstone, with a basal claystone.

References

External links 
 Kojarena Sandstone

Geologic formations of Australia
Jurassic System of Australia
Bajocian Stage
Sandstone formations
Geology of Western Australia